Experimental ecology refers to work done by those who apply experimental methods to ecological study and the underlying processes. The immediate goal of the research is to understand the relationships between organisms and their natural environment.

References

Subfields of ecology